Never Ever is the debut extended play by South Korean singer Jiyeon. It was released on May 20, 2014, by Core Contents Media. "1 Minute 1 Second (Never Ever)" was released as the lead single.

Release
On April 2, 2014 it was announced that Jiyeon would have a solo album. Core Contents Media released a statement saying, "Jiyeon’s solo concept is sexy and will be similar to Park Jiyoon's 'Coming of Age Ceremony', but with a modern 2014-esque twist."

On May 20, 2014 the extended play Never Ever was released along with the music video for the title track "1 Minute 1 Second (Never Ever)" and a dance practice video.  "1 Minute, 1 Second (Never Ever)" is a medium-tempo song produced by Duble Sidekick. The EP also includes the melancholic "Marionette" and "Yeouido Cherry Blossom", a song by composer Ahn Young-min. 
On May 23, 2014, it was announced that Jiyeon had been forced to change the dance for "1 Minute 1 Second (Never Ever)" due to the hip dance being deemed too sexy and provocative for the public. A news release from MBK Entertainment said "It is true that we received the call to adjust the mentioned dance from the major broadcast station reps... We added the sexy hip dance to the beginning and middle of the performance dance and music video not to give an erotic feeling, but rather to match the atmosphere of the sensitive dance song '1 Minute 1 Second'... However, we do think that the major broadcast music show reps do have a point, so we have decided to show a modified dance to the viewers."

Reception

Critical reception 
"Never Ever" received generally positive reviews from critics. PopMatters praised Jiyeon's emotional vocals that makes it powerful and relatable. The magazine especially praised the music video and the choreography "but it’s really the music video, with the unique choreography and powerful message that are going to be remembered."

Commercial performance 
The EP reached number 3 on the Gaon Weekly Albums Chart.  The title track "1 Minute 1 Second (Never Ever)" made it to number 17 on the Gaon Weekly Digital Chart.

Track listing

Charts and sales

Albums chart

Sales and certifications

Accolades

Awards and nominations

Listicles

Release history

References

External links
 

T-ara albums
2014 debut EPs
Korean-language EPs
Dance-pop EPs
Genie Music EPs